William B. Finnegan (September 19, 1890 - October 18, 1970) was an American Thoroughbred horse racing trainer.

A native of New York City, Finnegan spent more than fifty years as a trainer primarily on the West Coast of the United States. During his career he conditioned horses for major stable owners such as Vera S. Bragg, movie mogul Louis B. Mayer, Walter P. Chrysler Jr., Edward S. Moore's Circle M Ranch stable, George A. Pope, Jr.'s El Peco Ranch, and Neil S. McCarthy who would name one of his horses in his honor.

Following its opening in December 1929, Finnegan was racing at Agua Caliente Racetrack  in Tijuana, Mexico.
 Racing in California, where he would make his home in Arcadia near Santa Anita Park, Finnegan won the 1939 Hollywood Derby with Shining One who equalled the Hollywood Park track record.
 In 1940, he took over as the trainer of Big Pebble after the four-year-old was purchased by client, Edward S. Moore. Raced by his former owner at age two and three, Big Pebble showed little and had even been used as a lead pony. Under Finnegan in 1941, Big Pebble blossomed into the best older horse in the United States. En route to being named American Champion Older Male Horse, Big Pebble's wins included the most important and richest race in Florida, the Widener Challenge Cup at Hialeah Park Race Track and the prestigious Hollywood Gold Cup at California's Hollywood Park Racetrack.

In October 1951, that year's Kentucky Derby winner Count Turf was sent to Bill Finnegan to race in California but met with little success.
 Thirteen years late, Finnegan would have the betting favorite going into the 1964 U.S. Triple Crown series with George A. Pope, Jr.'s colt,  Hill Rise. The winner of eight straight races,  including the Santa Anita Derby by six lengths in record time  and the Derby Trial by more than two lengths, Hill Rise ran second to Northern Dancer in the Kentucky Derby  and third to him in the Preakness Stakes. The following year Hill Rise won several important races for Finnegan including the Man o' War Stakes, San Fernando Stakes and Santa Anita Handicap and at age five in 1966, the San Antonio Handicap.

William Finnegan continued to train horses until his death in 1970 at age eighty. He is buried in the 
Live Oak Memorial Park Cemetery in Monrovia, California.

References

1890 births
1970 deaths
American horse trainers
Sportspeople from New York City
People from Arcadia, California